The Ties That Blind is the second studio album by the sludge metal band Mouth of the Architect. Recorded at Red Room Recordings in Seattle, WA, it was released on Translation Loss Records on 22 August 2006.

Prior to recording, Alex Vernon left the group, leaving Gregory Lahm to record all guitar parts. Without a bassist since the departure of Derik Sommer, Brian Cook of These Arms Are Snakes filled in to write and record all bass parts. "At Arms Length" features vocals by Brent Hinds (Mastodon).

The album was released on CD, limited edition 300 red double LP (a few of these copies came with a "black smoke" effect) and limited edition 700 black double LP.

Track listing

Personnel
Gregory Lahm – vocals, guitar
Jason Watkins - vocals, keyboards
Dave Mann - drums
Brian Cook – bass guitar
Brent Hinds - vocals (track 5)
Chris Common - producer, engineer, mixer
Ed Brooks - mastering
Paul Jeffrey - design, layout

References

Mouth of the Architect albums
2006 albums